Jwalamukhi is a 1980 Hindi movie produced by Babboo Mehra and directed by Prakash Mehra. The film stars Waheeda Rehman, Shatrughan Sinha, Reena Roy, Amjad Khan, Vinod Mehra, Shabana Azmi, Kader Khan, Pran, and Bindu.

Production
The film, which told the same story as the 1978 Telugu film Katakataala Rudraiah, was produced around the same time as the similar, and ultimately much more successful, film Jyoti Bane Jwala.

Plot 
Savita (Waheeda Rehman) and Inspector Rakesh (Raj Babbar) are in love and are getting married. But on the wedding day, Savita finds him murdered, and the blame was put on the dacoit Shersingh (Amjad Khan). She gives birth to a son, Rajesh (Shatrughan Sinha), whom her aunt has thrown away, and she is told he died at birth. Rajesh is found and raised by Mr. Rai (Pran), who is blackmailed into illegal smuggling by his friend P.D. (Kader Khan). Savita Devi marries, has a son Vikram (Vinod Mehra) who grows up with Rajesh as his best friend. She becomes a notable spokesperson for orphans. One day she encounters P.D., and realizes that he is the one who killed Inspector Rakesh. She then finds out that Rajesh is her first son, his true love is Kiran (Shabana Azmi), the daughter of the evil P.D. With the help of Shersingh, she protects both her sons and keep the secrets of a past life.

Cast

Waheeda Rehman as Savita
Shatrughan Sinha as Rajesh
Vinod Mehra as Vikram
Shabana Azmi as Kiran
Reena Roy as Anju
Amjad Khan as Shersingh
Kader Khan as P.D.
Pran as Mr. Rai
Shreeram Lagoo as Anand
Mumtaz Begum (actress) as Bua, Savitri Aunt
Aruna Irani as Sheela Rai
Shivraj as Savita's Father
Ram Sethi as Chamanlal Pabra
Bindu as Kamini , Nurse
Yunus Parvez as Colonel
Vikas Anand as  Kaka, Shersingh Uncle
Goga Kapoor as PD Henchman

Soundtrack 
The music of the film was composed by Kalyanji–Anandji, while lyrics were written by Anjaan.

References

External links 
 

1980 films
1980s Hindi-language films
Films directed by Prakash Mehra